Yemisi Sophie Odusanya (born 1984) also known as Sisi Yemmie is a Nigerian food and lifestyle blogger.

Early life and education 
Sisi Yemmie was born in 1984 and she grew up in Warri, Delta State. She earned a degree in Mass Communication from Igbinedion University, Okada and later got a master's degree in International Diplomacy from the University of Birmingham and a Diploma in Internal Communications from PR Academy, London.

Career 
Sisi Yemmie creates and shares food recipe videos that are created as a result of experiments carried out in her kitchen on her YouTube channel, SisiYemmieTV. She also shares content on parenting, relationships and lifestyle. In 2018, she was profiled by CNN Africa alongside Linda Ikeji and Chiamaka Obuekwe as "women who have struck social media gold". As at February 2019, she had 168,000 subscribers, 531 videos, and 18.4 million views on her YouTube channel. Her channel was described as "Brilliant" by Prince Charles during his visit to British Council in Lagos. She was listed as a top female Nigerian YouTuber in December 2020.

She served as the editorial lead on Cosmopolitan Nigeria.

Personal life 
She and her then fiancé, Yomi Odusanya won the first season of the My Big Nigerian Wedding reality show and had their wedding sponsored to the tune of ₦15 million. They have 3 
children.

Awards and nominations

References

External links
 

Nigerian YouTubers
1984 births
Living people